The Winnipeg Maroons were a minor League baseball team based in Winnipeg, Manitoba, Canada, which played in the Northern League from 1902–1942. Their home field from 1906 to 1922 was Happyland Park, which had a seating capacity of 4,000. They subsequently played at Sherburn Park, which had a seating capacity of 3,500. One of the most successful teams in the league, they won league championships eight times (1902, 1903, 1907, 1912, 1916, 1935, 1939, 1942).

In 1933 they re-entered the Northern League, the lowest classification of professional minor league ball (D class).

List of Northern League Championship Wins
1902 Winnipeg Maroons
1903 Winnipeg Maroons
1907 Winnipeg Maroons
1916 Winnipeg Maroons
1935 Winnipeg Maroons
1939 Winnipeg Maroons
1942 Winnipeg Maroons

References

 
Defunct minor league baseball teams
Baseball teams in Winnipeg
Baseball teams established in 1902
Baseball teams disestablished in 1942
Pittsburgh Pirates minor league affiliates
1902 establishments in Manitoba
Northern League (1902-71) baseball teams
1942 disestablishments in Manitoba